Lauroux is a commune in the Hérault département in the Occitanie region in southern France.

History
The Dominican inquisitor Bernardus Guidonis died in the castle.

Population

See also
Communes of the Hérault department

References

External links

Regional site

Communes of Hérault